The 1997 Fraser by-election was held in the Australian electorate of Fraser in the Australian Capital Territory on 1 February 1997. The by-election was triggered by the resignation of the sitting member, the Australian Labor Party's John Langmore on 6 December 1996. The writ for the by-election was issued on 30 December 1996.

Background
John Langmore had held the seat of Fraser since the 1984 election, but resigned to take up the post of Director of the Division for Social Policy and Development at the United Nations.

Cheryl Hill had previously stood for election in Fraser as a Liberal Party candidate in the 1996 federal election. She had also unsuccessfully stood for election for the New South Wales Legislative Assembly seat of Bulli in the 1991 New South Wales election. By the time of the Fraser by-election, Hill had resigned from the Liberal Party because of the party's attitude to race and immigration, and chose to run as an independent.

Results

Aftermath
The by-election was won easily by Steve Dargavel, the ALP candidate, who held the seat until 1998 when he lost preselection in favour of Bob McMullan.

Dargavel's election saw only a minor swing away from the ALP, a remarkable result since the by-election fielded ten candidates in contrast to three candidates in the previous general election in 1996.

In contrast to Dargavel as the ALP candidate, the absence of the Liberal Party in the by-election and with their 1996 candidate Cheryl Hill running as an independent, the by-election saw Hill's personal vote dropped more than 20% in the primary vote and a fall of 8% in the two-candidate preferred basis.

See also
 List of Australian federal by-elections

References

External links
Fraser (ACT) By-Election (1 February 1997), Australian Electoral Commission

1997 elections in Australia
Australian Capital Territory federal by-elections
1990s in the Australian Capital Territory
February 1997 events in Australia